Tipula trivittata is a species of large crane fly in the family Tipulidae.

References

Further reading

External links

 Diptera.info

Tipulidae